E Ala Ē (meaning wake up or stand up) is the third album by the Hawaiian singer Israel Kamakawiwo'ole, released in 1995.

Track listing
 E Ala Ē
 ʻUlili E
 Kaleohano
 Wind Beneath My Wings (Jeff Silbar and Larry Henley Cover) / He Hawaiʻi Au
 Tengoku Kara Kaminari (Thunder from Heaven)
 Kamalani
 Aloha Ka Manini
 Maui Medley
 Hele On To Kauai
 Kauai Beauty
 Theme from Gilligan's Island
 I Ke Alo O Iesu
 A Hawaiian Like Me

References

1995 albums
Israel Kamakawiwoʻole albums